The 2011 Drake Bulldogs football team represented Drake University as member of the Pioneer Football League (PFL) during the 2011 NCAA Division I FCS football season. Led by fourth-year head coach Chris Creighton, the Bulldogs compiled and overall record of 9–2 with a mark of 7–1 in conference play, sharing the PFL title with San Diego. The team played home games at Drake Stadium in Des Moines, Iowa.

Schedule

Previous season and Kilimanjaro Bowl
The Bulldogs finished third in 2010 Pioneer Football League. On May 21, 2011, Drake participated in the 2011 Global Kilimanjaro Bowl against CONADEIP, a Mexican College Football all-star team. The game, which took place at Sheikh Amri Abeid Memorial Stadium in Arusha, Tanzania, was the first American Football and first College Football game ever played in Africa. Drake won the game 17–7. The team finished with an 8–4 record in the 2010–11 season, which included their first bowl victory since 1949.

2011 season summary
Drake continued their success during the 2011 season after the victory in the Kilimanjaro Bowl. The Bulldogs shared the Pioneer Football League title. Coach Creighton and his team were honored with the NCAS Giant Steps Award for their charity work in Africa. They were also featured in a documentary by CBS Sports for their work in Africa.

After an opening loss to North Dakota, Drake compiled five victories in a row before losing a close contest to San Diego. The loss would be their last, as the Bulldogs won their final four games of the season. Notable games included Marist (played in a snow storm), Jacksonville (a last second touchdown victory), and Dayton (the conference title clincher).

References

Drake
Drake Bulldogs football seasons
Pioneer Football League champion seasons
Drake Bulldogs football